The 2020–21 St. John's Red Storm men's basketball team represented St. John's University during the 2020–21 NCAA Division I men's basketball season. They are coached by Mike Anderson, in his second year at the school, and  play their home games at Carnesecca Arena and Madison Square Garden as members of the Big East Conference. They finished the season 16-11, 10-9 in Big East Play to finish in 4th place. They lost in the quarterfinals of the Big East tournament to Seton Hall.

Previous season
The Red Storm finished the season 17–15, 5–13 in Big East play to finish in a tie for eighth place. As the No. 9 seed in the Big East tournament, they defeated Georgetown in the first round before having their quarterfinal game against Creighton canceled at halftime due to the ongoing coronavirus pandemic.

Offseason

Departures

Incoming transfers

2020 recruiting class

2021 Recruiting class

Roster

Schedule and results

|-
!colspan=12 style=|Regular season

|-
!colspan=9 style=|Big East tournament

Rankings

References

St. John's
St. John's Red Storm men's basketball seasons
Saint John's